Norbert Leser (May 31, 1933 – December 31, 2014) was an Austrian jurist, political scientist and social philosopher best known for his lifelong affiliation with, and critical work on, the Social Democratic Party of Austria and Austromarxism in particular. He was born in Oberwart and died in Eisenstadt.

Bibliography

Zwischen Reformismus und Bolschewismus. Der Austromarxismus in Theorie und Praxis (1968) 
Die Odyssee des Marxismus (1971)
Jenseits von Marx und Freud (1980)
Das geistige Leben Wiens in der Zwischenkriegszeit (1981) 
Grenzgänger, 2 vols. (1981–82)  
Sozialphilosophie (1984)
Genius Austriacus (1986)
Salz der Gesellschaft (1988)
Von Leser zu Leser (1992)
Elegie auf Rot (1998)
"... auf halben Wegen und zu halber Tat ...". Politische Auswirkungen einer österreichischen Befindlichkeit (2000)
Gottes Türen und Fenster (2001)
Zeitzeuge an Kreuzwegen (2003).
Der Sturz des Adlers. 120 Jahre österreichische Sozialdemokratie (2008)

Decorations and awards
1967: Dr. Karl Renner Journalism Prize of the Austrian Journalists Club
 Theodor Innitzer Prize
 Austrian Cross of Honour for Science and Art, 1st class
1992: Corresponding member of the Austrian Academy of Sciences
1999: City of Vienna Prize for Humanities
 Norbert Leser carries further the honour band of Catholic Austrian Landsmannschaft Maximiliana

1933 births
2014 deaths
People from Oberwart
Austrian jurists
Social philosophers
Anton Wildgans Prize winners
Recipients of the Austrian Cross of Honour for Science and Art, 1st class